Chuadanga Government College is an educational institution in the municipality of Chuadanga, headquarters of Chuadanga District, in western Bangladesh. Founded in 1962, it is the oldest college in the district. It was nationalized on 7 May 1979. It is affiliated to National University.

Campus 

In a pleasant environment surrounded by the trees, the students are in the 18 acre campus lively with eight college buildings.

Amount of land 
The total land area of Chuadanga Government College is 18 acres.

Students 
Today, the college has more than 12,586 students.

Teaching staffs 
Agricultural education, computer education, botany, zoology, chemistry, Bengali, English, economics, political science, philosophy, history and culture of Islam, history, management and accounting, Bengali, economics, political science, history and accountancy classes of Islam are conducted by 74 teachers.

Voluntary organizations 
BNCC, Rover Scout, Red Crescent, TTH etc.

References

Educational institutions established in 1962
Colleges in Chuadanga District
Universities and colleges in Chuadanga District
1962 establishments in East Pakistan